Centralhatchee Creek is a stream in the U.S. state of Georgia.  It is a tributary to the Chattahoochee River.

Centralhatchee is a name derived from the Muskogean language meaning "fish stream". Variant names are "Sundahatchee Creek" and "Sundalhatchee Creek".

References

Rivers of Georgia (U.S. state)
Rivers of Heard County, Georgia